Mušović is a Serbo-Croatian surname. Notable people with the surname include:

Džemaludin Mušović (born 1944), Bosnian football manager
Lepa Lukić (née Mušović) (born 1940), Serbian singer
Miljana Musović (born 1987), Serbian basketball player
Tafil Musović (born 1950), Dutch painter
Zećira Mušović (born 1996), Swedish footballer

See also
Musović
Mušić

Bosnian surnames
Patronymic surnames
Serbian surnames